Nu Cygni, Latinized from ν Cygni, is a binary star system  in the constellation Cygnus. Its apparent magnitude is 3.94 and it is approximately 374 light years away based on parallax. The brighter component is a magnitude 4.07 A-type giant star with a stellar classification of A0III n, where the 'n' indicates broad "nebulous" absorption lines due to rapid rotation. This white-hued star has an estimated 3.6 times the mass of the Sun and about 1.9 times the Sun's radius. It is radiating 412 times the Sun's luminosity from its photosphere at an effective temperature of 9,462 K. The magnitude 6.4 companion has an angular separation of 0.24" from the primary.

References

Cygnus (constellation)
A-type giants
Cygni, Nu
103413
8028
199629
Cygni, 58
Durchmusterung objects